Performance anxiety, or stage fright, is an anxiety or phobia aroused in a person when required to perform in front of an audience.

Performance anxiety may also refer to:
 Performance Anxiety (film), a 2008 film by Paul Dangerfield
 Performance Anxieties, a published work by Dr. Ann Pellegrini
 Sexual performance anxiety, a type of sexual dysfunction